Damir Pertič (born 10 July 1981) is a retired Slovenian futsal player.

References

External links
NZS profile 

1981 births
Living people
Slovenian men's futsal players